Odysia is a genus of moths in the family Geometridae erected by Achille Guenée in 1858.

Species
Odysia accessilinea Prout, 1910
Odysia amyntoridaria Oberthür, 1923
Odysia isoteles Prout, 1933
Odysia laetipicta Prout, 1931
Odysia molaria Guenée, [1858]
Odysia punctilineata Warren, 1900

References

Boarmiini